Schön may refer to:

 Schön (surname), German surname
 Schön!, English-language fashion magazine
 Schön Klinik, clinic group based in Prien am Chiemsee, Germany
 Schön Palace, palace in Sosnowiec, Poland
 Schön Properties, real estate developer in Dubai
 Schön scandal, scandal involving German physicist Jan Hendrik Schön and his articles about semiconductors

See also 

 Schein
 Schoen

German words and phrases